Ariana Ghez (born 1979) is an American classical oboist.  She pursued her undergraduate studies at Columbia University where she majored in English literature, and at the Juilliard School, where she studied with John Mack and John Ferrillo.  She  was enrolled in the joint program between the two schools.  She was a graduate student at Temple University under Richard Woodhams.  She served as principal oboist of the Rochester Philharmonic Orchestra during the 2005-2006 season, and principal oboist of the Santa Fe Opera (2005).  From 2006 through 2017, she was the principal oboist of the Los Angeles Philharmonic Orchestra. In 2017, she left the LA Phil to pursue interests outside of the musical world. She and her family now reside in the Pacific Northwest.

External links
 https://web.archive.org/web/20080422215636/http://www.laphil.com/music/artist_detail.cfm?id=2985

1979 births
Living people
American classical oboists
Aspen Music Festival and School faculty
Columbia College (New York) alumni
Juilliard School alumni
Women oboists